Decatur Township is the name of some places in the U.S. state of Pennsylvania:

Decatur Township, Clearfield County, Pennsylvania
Decatur Township, Mifflin County, Pennsylvania

Pennsylvania township disambiguation pages